12th Central Committee may refer to:
Central Committee of the 12th Congress of the Russian Communist Party (Bolsheviks), 1923–1924
12th Central Committee of the Bulgarian Communist Party, 1981–1986
12th Central Committee of the Chinese Communist Party, 1982–1987
12th Central Committee of the Romanian Communist Party, 1979–1984
12th Central Committee of the Communist Party of Vietnam, 2016–2021
12th Central Committee of the League of Communists of Yugoslavia, 1982–1986